Kindred Spirits is an American paranormal television and documentary reality series. The series premiered on October 21, 2016 on Destination America and TLC, airing there until 2018. It has aired on Travel Channel since the beginning of the third season in 2019. The program stars investigators Adam Berry and Amy Bruni, formerly from the Ghost Hunters and Ghost Hunters Academy television series, which aired on Syfy at the time of Berry and Bruni's departure. Berry and Bruni investigate residences to determine if recurring paranormal activity is tied to the families living there. For the fourth season, psychic medium Chip Coffey joined the cast. The Perron family returned in the second episode of the fourth season, with Amy Bruni giving direction to James Wan's franchise

On December 15, 2022, a seventh season was announced, which premiered on January 20, 2023.

Series overview

Episodes

Season 1 (2016)
Note: Season 1 premiered on Destination America, but also aired on TLC.

Season 2 (2017–18)
Note: Season 2 premiered on TLC, but also aired on Destination America.

Season 3 (2019)

Season 4 (2020)

Season 5 (2021)

Season 6 (2021–22)

Season 7 (2023)

Notes

Production
The first season premiered on Destination America and TLC on October 21, 2016, and concluded December 9, 2016. On March 8, 2017, TLC renewed the series for a second season, which premiered on September 15, 2017. The third season premiered on the Travel Channel on January 24, 2019.

On December 5, 2019, it was announced that the fourth season will premiere on January 3, 2020. Medium Chip Coffey was announced to be joining the main cast along with Bruni and Berry for the fourth season. On November 18, 2021, a sixth season was announced, which premiered on December 18, 2021.

Popular culture

Guest appearances
Berry, Bruni, and Coffey all appeared in Travel Channel's October 4, 2019 live 4 hour special titled Haunted Salem: Live which teamed them with investigators from other Travel Channel series (such as Jack Osbourne and Katrina Weidman of Portals to Hell) for an extensive paranormal investigation of Salem, Massachusetts and its ties to the Salem Witch Trials.

See also

Apparitional experience
List of ghost films
List of reportedly haunted locations in the United States

References

External links
Kindred Spirits webpage at Destination America.com
Kindred Spirits webpage at TLC.com
Kindred Spirits webpage at Travel Channel.com

2016 American television series debuts
2010s American documentary television series
Destination America original programming
English-language television shows
Ghost Hunters (TV series)
Television series about ghosts
Paranormal reality television series
TLC (TV network) original programming
Travel Channel original programming